= Klassa =

Bulgarian newspaper

Klassa (Bulgarian: Класа, meaning Class in English) was a Bulgarian newspaper, which published content from the Financial Times. The paper was first published on 3 September 2007. Its publisher was Klassa Bulgaria EAD.

With a circulation of more than 10,000 copies, its subscribers were mainly legal or economic institutions and members of the business community. In 2009, the paper launched a bilingual website. Neda Popova served as the editor-in-chief of the paper, which went online in 2010.
